The National Security Council (NSC) is an advisory body for the Government of Georgia dealing with matters of national security. The Council is led by the Prime Minister and includes other high ranking government, intelligence and military officials.

History 
The National Security Council (NSC) of Georgia was established under President Eduard Shevardnadze on 24 January 1996. The respective law defined the Council as an advisory body of the President of Georgia for decision-making on strategic questions of the organisation of military construction and defence, international and foreign policy related to the security of the country, maintenance of stability, law and order.

The National Security Council included the Ministers of State (later Prime Minister), Foreign Affairs, Defense, State Security (abolished in 2004), Internal Affairs, and the Secretary of the NSC. The President served as the Chairperson of the Council. The Chairperson of Parliament and those of the Supreme Representative Bodies of Abkhazia and Adjara Autonomous Republics, though not members, were to participate in the NSC activities. The NSC Secretary had a number of duties, including general organizational, coordination, and management duties related to the functioning of the NSC and the NSC Apparatus. The Secretary also serves in the role of Assistant to the President of Georgia "on questions of national security".

The NSC was abolished by a controversial law passed by the Parliament of Georgia on 31 October 2018, which became effective upon the inauguration of President Salome Zurabishvili on 16 December 2018. The decision was criticized by the then-President Giorgi Margvelashvili, the incumbent NSC secretary David Rakviashvili, and foreign commentators such as Ronald S. Mangum.

In April 2019, the NSC was reestablished under the leadership of Prime Minister. It also includes seven other permanent members: Ministers of Defense, Internal Affairs, Foreign Affairs, and Finances, as well as heads of state security and intelligence services, and Chief of Defense Forces. The reconstituted Council had its inaugural meeting on 1 May 2019.

National Defense Council 
According to the 2018 constitutional amendment, a consultative body—the National Defense Council—is called for only during martial law. It is chaired by the President of Georgia and also includes the Prime Minister, the Chairperson of Parliament, the Minister of Defense, and the Chief of Defense Forces. The President of Georgia can invite individual members of the Parliament and of the Government to join the Council as members.

Members 

 Irakli Gharibashvili, Prime Minister of Georgia
 Vakhtang Gomelauri, Minister of Internal Affairs of Georgia; NSC Secretary
 Grigol Liluashvili, Head of the State Security Service of Georgia
 Juansher Burchuladze, Minister of Defense of Georgia 
 Shalva Lomidze, Head of Intelligence Service of Georgia
 Lasha Khutsishvili, Minister of Finance of Georgia
 Ilia Darchiashvili, Minister of Foreign Affairs of Georgia
 Giorgi Matiashvili, Chief of the Georgian Defence Forces

List of secretaries of the National Security Council
 Vakhtang Gomelauri, 19 February 2020 -
 Levan Izoria, 8 September 2019 - 27 January 2020
 Giorgi Gakharia, 1 May 2019 – 3 September 2019
 David Rakviashvili, October 2016 – December 2018 
 Irina Imerlishvili, November 2013 – October 2016
 Giga Bokeria, November 2010 – November 2013
 Eka Tkeshelashvili, December 2008 – November 2010
 Alexander Lomaia, November 2007 – December 2008 
 Kote Kemularia, December 2005 – November 2007 
 Levan Choladze, October 2005 – December 2005
 Gela Bezhuashvili, June 2004 – October 2005 
 Ivane Merabishvili, January 2004 – June 2004
 Tedo Japaridze, March 2002 – November 2003
 Nugzar Sajaia, 1996 – February 2002

References

Government agencies of Georgia (country)
Georgia
1996 establishments in Georgia (country)
Government agencies established in 1996
2018 disestablishments in Georgia (country)
Government agencies established in 2018
2019 establishments in Georgia (country)
Government agencies established in 2019